Erebus crepuscularis is a moth of the family Erebidae first described by Carl Linnaeus in his 1758 10th edition of Systema Naturae. It is found in Indonesia, New Guinea, Taiwan (including Green Island and Orchid Island) and the Australian states of Queensland and New South Wales.

References

Moths described in 1758
Taxa named by Carl Linnaeus
Erebus (moth)